Lee Chen-chu (born 7 May 1940) is a Taiwanese boxer. He competed in the men's bantamweight event at the 1964 Summer Olympics.

References

1940 births
Living people
Taiwanese male boxers
Olympic boxers of Taiwan
Boxers at the 1964 Summer Olympics
Place of birth missing (living people)
Bantamweight boxers
20th-century Taiwanese people